A poster is a piece of printed paper designed to be attached to a wall or vertical surface

Poster may also refer to:

Poster (surname)
Mount Poster, Antarctic mountain
The Poster, British magazine 1898-1900

See also
Posta (disambiguation)